The 1988 Arkansas Razorbacks football team represented the University of Arkansas in the Southwest Conference (SWC) during the 1988 NCAA Division I-A football season.

Arkansas won the SWC championship, finishing undefeated in conference play. Defensive end Wayne Martin, safety Steve Atwater, and placekicker Kendall Trainor were all named 1st Team All-American. Senior linebacker LaSalle Harper was named Defensive MVP of the 1989 Cotton Bowl, despite Arkansas losing the game.

Schedule

Roster

Rankings

Game summaries

at Texas

Texas A&M

at Miami (FL)

Source:

vs. UCLA (Cotton Bowl)

1989 NFL Draft

References

Arkansas
Arkansas Razorbacks football seasons
Southwest Conference football champion seasons
Arkansas Razorbacks football